African map may refer to:

Cartography of Africa
Cyrestis camillus, the African map butterfly